Dal Ati (Keep at It) is a series of Welsh language television programmes broadcast on S4C to help Welsh speakers and learners gain confidence in the language. It was launched at the 2014 National Eisteddfod of Wales. The series consists of two programmes, each an hour long, broadcast on Sunday mornings. The first series began on 28 September 2014. 

The two Sunday programmes include Bore Da (Good Morning) and Milltir Sgwâr (Square Mile). The former, presented by Elin Llwyd and Alun Williams, covers lifestyle topics (including items from recent episodes of Heno) in easy-to-follow Welsh. The latter takes presenter Nia Parry to different places in Wales to meet people and explore the location. Later in 2015 a regular hour long programme, Galwch Acw, put Welsh learners' language and cooking skills to the test.

Dal Ati was replaced in January 2019 by a new Welsh-language service for learners, S4C Dysgu Cymraeg, which broadcast programmes on Sunday afternoons.

References

External links 
 Dal Ati website

2014 British television series debuts
2010s Welsh television series
S4C original programming